Johann Georg Theodor Grässe (or Graesse) (31 January 1814 – 27 August 1885) was a German bibliographer and literary historian. He worked in Dresden at the Münzkabinett and also edited the journal Zeitschrift für Museologie und Antiquitätenkunde.

Works
 
 Gesta Romanorum (Dresden, 1842)
 Bibliotheca magica (Leipzig, 1843)
 Handbuch der allgemeinen Litteraturgeschichte (Dresden, 1844-50); 2nd ed.
 Bibliotheca psychologica (1845) 
 Legenda aurea des Jacobus de Voragine (1846) 
 Die Sage vom Ritter Tannhäuser (1846)
 Geschichte der Poesie Europas und der bedeutendsten außreuropïschen Länder vom Anfang des 16. Jahrhunderts bis auf die neueuste Zeit (1848)
 Leitfaden der allgemeinen Literaturgeschichte (Leipzig, 1854)
 Sagenschatz des Königreichs Sachsen (1855)
 Sachsens Fürsten in Bildern mit geschichtlichen Erläuterungen. (Dresden, 1856)
 With Peter Christen Asbjörnsen: Nord und Süd. Ein Märchen-Strauß (Dresden, 1858) 
 
 Orbis Latinus (Dresden, 1861)
 Märchenwelt. Verlag Moritz Schäfer (Leipzig, 1865)
 Sagenbuch des preußischen Staats (Dresden, 1866–71)
 Beschreibender Katalog der königlichen Porzellansammlung (Dresden, 1874)
 Sachsens Fürsten aus dem Haus Wettin (1875)
 Geschlechts-, Namen- und Wappensagen des Adels deutscher Nation (Dresden, 1876)
 Beschreibender Katalog des Grünen Gewölbes (5th ed., 1881)

References

External links

WorldCat. Grässe, Johann Georg Theodor 1814-1885

German bibliographers
German literary historians
German male non-fiction writers
1814 births
1885 deaths